Political dissent is a dissatisfaction with or opposition to the policies of a governing body. Expressions of dissent may take forms from vocal disagreement to civil disobedience to the use of violence.

The Constitution of the United States regards non-violent demonstration and disagreement with the government as fundamental American values.

Techniques 

 Protests, demonstrations, peace march, protest march
 Boycotts, sit-ins, riots, organizing committees, grassroots organizing
 Strike, general strike, street action
 Bumper stickers, flyers, political posters
 Street theater, political puppets
 Burning an effigy
 Self-immolation (setting self on fire)
 Revolution, Revolt, Rebellion, Terrorism, Insurrection, popular uprising
 Samizdat
 Propaganda, counter-propaganda, slogans, sloganeering, meme
 Lobbying

See also 

 Dissident
 Dissent
 Parliamentary opposition
 Leader of the Opposition
 Opposition (politics)
 Election threshold
 Tor (anonymity network)
 Freenet
 Sluggish schizophrenia

References

Political activism
Dissent